Aafke Soet (born 23 November 1997) is a Dutch cyclist, who currently rides for UCI Women's Continental Team . Before cycling, she was a speed skater who had represented the Netherlands at the 2012 Winter Youth Olympics. In 2018, she won stage 5 of the Healthy Ageing Tour. She will retire from cycling at the end of 2022.

Major results
2014
 1st  Time trial, UEC European Junior Road Championships
 1st  Time trial, National Junior Road Championships
2015
 2nd Time trial, National Junior Road Championships
2017
 7th Chrono des Nations
2018
 UEC European Under-23 Road Championships
1st  Time trial
2nd Road race
 1st Time trial, Omloop van Borsele
 1st Stage 5 Healthy Ageing Tour
 1st  Young rider classification Emakumeen Euskal Bira

References

External links

1997 births
Living people
Dutch female cyclists
Dutch female short track speed skaters
Short track speed skaters at the 2012 Winter Youth Olympics
Sportspeople from Heerenveen
Cyclists from Friesland
21st-century Dutch women
20th-century Dutch women
20th-century Dutch people